The Hogan River is a tributary of the Boisvert River (Normandin River), flowing into the unorganized territory of the Lac-Ashuapmushuan, Quebec, in the Regional County Municipality (RCM) of Le Domaine-du-Roy, in the administrative region of Saguenay-Lac-Saint-Jean, in Quebec, in Canada.

This river crosses successively the cantons of Sarrasin and Rinfret. Forestry is the main economic activity of this valley; recreational tourism activities, second.

The forest Road R1004 (heading northeast) that connects to route 167 serves the northwestern part of the Boisvert River (Normandin River) Valley (Normandin River) and the eastern part of the Armitage River. Forest Road R0210 (North–south direction) serves the eastern part of the Boisvert River (Normandin River) Valley and the southern Hogan River Valley.

The surface of the Hogan River is usually frozen from early November to mid-May, however, safe ice movement is generally from mid-November to mid-April.

Geography

Toponymy 
The term "Hogan" is a family name of English origin.

The toponym "Hogan River" was formalized on March 28, 1972, at the Commission de toponymie du Québec, when it was created.

Notes and references

See also 

Rivers of Saguenay–Lac-Saint-Jean
Le Domaine-du-Roy Regional County Municipality